Colobothea securifera is a species of beetle in the family Cerambycidae. It was described by Bates in 1865. It is known from Brazil, Ecuador and Peru.

References

securifera
Beetles described in 1865
Beetles of South America